The Lonaria (or Lonari, Lonmali, Lonkar) are an Indian caste historically associated with saltmaking, as well as production of lime, charcoal, and cement.

Organisation
The caste is often referenced as a subdivision of the Mahar caste, traditionally an Untouchable community. Other listing group them slightly lower than the Mahar, as a "Lower Caste" along with the Garshi (drummers) and Kumhar (potters).

In Belgaum (Karnataka), the caste has two subsets named for their professional product: Mith (salt) and Chune (lime).

References

Social groups of Maharashtra
Social groups of Karnataka
Mahar
Saltmaking castes